Spend My Time is the ninth studio album by American country music singer Clint Black, released on March 2, 2004. It is his first since leaving RCA Nashville and creating his own record label, Equity Music Group. It includes the singles "Spend My Time", "The Boogie Man" and "My Imagination".

He worked on it intermittently for over four years, during which time he moved to Nashville and built a home recording studio. "I ended up with an abundance of material, which in a way made it more difficult. I had to determine which of these songs would make the best album."

Track listing
All songs written by Clint Black and Hayden Nicholas except where noted.

Personnel

Band
 Clint Black — harmonica, electric guitar, lead vocals, background vocals, bass harmonica
 Eddie Bayers — drums
 Lenny Castro — percussion
 Lisa Cochran — background vocals
 Eric Darken — percussion
 Jerry Douglas — Dobro
 Stuart Duncan — fiddle
 Paul Franklin — steel guitar
 Sonny Garrish — steel guitar
 Wes Hightower — background vocals
 Abraham Laboriel — bass
 Brent Mason — electric guitar
 Hayden Nicholas — electric guitar, slide guitar
 Dean Parks — banjo, resonator guitar
 Steve Real — background vocals
 John Robinson — drums
 Matt Rollings — Hammond organ, Wurlitzer, grand piano
 John Wesley Ryles — background vocals
 Russell Terrell — background vocals
 Steve Wariner — classical guitar
 Biff Watson — acoustic guitar
 Glenn Worf — bass
 Jonathan Yudkin — fiddle

Production
 Clint Black — producer, engineer
 Zack Berry — production coordinator
 David Bryant — assistant
 Ricky Cobble — mixing, assistant
 Wil Donovan — assistant
 Steve Dorff — arranger
 Buford Jones — crew
 Julian King — engineer, mixing
 Steve Lockhart — crew
 Jack Murray — crew
 Charles Paakkari — assistant
 Ray Rogers — technical support
 Elliot Scheiner — engineer
 Dara Whitehead — crew
 Hank Williams — mastering

Chart performance

Weekly charts

Year-end charts

Singles

References

Black Tracks: Spend My Time. ClintBlack.com. Retrieved on January 5, 2007.
Spend My Time Credits. Allmusic. Retrieved on January 5, 2007.
[ Artist Chart History (Singles)]. Billboard. Retrieved on January 3, 2007.
[ Artist Chart History (Albums)]. Billboard. Retrieved on January 3, 2007.

2004 albums
Clint Black albums
Equity Music Group albums
Albums produced by Clint Black